Stadium House in Park Street, Cardiff, Wales, is the third tallest building in Cardiff, Wales, which stands next to the Millennium Stadium.

Construction
 
Work started on the building in March 1974 and was completed in 1976. The building is now clad in white and blue, while the roof is topped with a  stainless steel spire, which was lit up green and white in the evening, to complement the cladding. This building is also an internet exchange point.

The building is clad in a composite material. Numerous incidents of the cladding falling off the building have resulted in adjacent roads being closed.

See also
List of tallest buildings in Cardiff

References

External links
 
www.skyscrapernews.com - BT Stadium House

Landmarks in Cardiff
Office buildings in Cardiff
British Telecom buildings and structures
Skyscrapers in Wales
Skyscraper office buildings in the United Kingdom